Kiera Allen is an American actress known for her role in the Hulu thriller Run.

Personal life 
Allen was raised in New York. She is a Creative Writing student at Columbia University with the class of 2022. She uses a wheelchair for mobility.

Career
In 2014, Allen appeared in the short film Ethan & Skye. She featured in Bekah Brunstetter's off-Broadway show Girl #2 in 2017. She made her film debut in the 2020 thriller Run with Sarah Paulson, which became the most-watched original film on the streaming service. She is the second female wheelchair-using actress to star in a suspense film, following Susan Peters doing the same in 1948.

Filmography

References

External links
 

Living people
1997 births
21st-century American actresses
American film actresses
American stage actresses
People with paraplegia
Columbia College (New York) alumni